Kyle Jerome White (born March 27, 1987) is an American financial analyst and former United States Army soldier. He is the seventh living recipient of the Medal of Honor from the War in Afghanistan.

Early life
White was born on March 27, 1987, and lived in Bonney Lake, Washington. He enlisted in the United States Army on February 15, 2006, attending basic training, advanced individual training, as well the United States Army Airborne School consecutively, at Fort Benning. White's military education includes the Combat Life Saver Course, United States Army Air Assault School, Infantryman Course (One-Station Unit Training), Primary Leadership Development Course and Reconnaissance and Surveillance Leaders Course.

Military service
 
White was assigned to the 2nd Battalion, 503rd Infantry Regiment from 2006 to 2008. In early 2007, as part of Operation Enduring Freedom, he was deployed to Aranas, Afghanistan where he served as a platoon radio telephone operator. White's actions on November 9, 2007, were the basis for his receiving the Medal of Honor.

From 2008 to 2010, White was assigned to the 4th Ranger Training Battalion at Fort Benning. In May 2011 he departed the active-duty United States Army.

Medal of Honor
Prior to the event that lead to the awarding of the Medal of Honor, White noticed that during a Shura "it seemed like every male fighting-age and above was there in attendance." Half an hour later he and his unit were under attack. During the Battle of Aranas on November 9, 2007, White suffered a mild traumatic brain injury from a Rocket-propelled grenade blast and from the subsequent blast of a 120mm mortar round fired by United States forces. Although injured himself, White provided assistance to the soldiers and Marines around him while under heavy fire. He was later diagnosed with post-traumatic stress disorder, but says he copes with its symptoms by exercising. Through 2014, White's face still had bullet fragments from an AK-47 round that shattered on a rock in front of him.

After the battle, paperwork regarding a potential Medal of Honor awarding was delayed in the Pentagon. On May 14, 2014, White received the Medal of Honor in a White House ceremony, for administering life saving medical aid to comrades and for radioing situational reports; that battle resulted in five soldiers (1st Lt. Matthew C. Ferrara, Sgt. Jeffery S. Mersman, Spc. Sean K. A. Langevin, Spc. Lester G. Roque, and Pfc. Joseph M. Lancour) and Marine Sgt. Phillip A. Bocks being killed and all eight surviving Americans being wounded. White became the seventh living recipient of the Medal of Honor from either the Iraq War or Afghanistan operations. The following day, White was inducted into the Pentagon's Hall of Heroes by Deputy Defense Secretary Robert O. Work.

Citation

Post-military career
In 2013, White received a Bachelor of Science degree in Business Administration from the University of North Carolina at Charlotte, where he majored in finance. He became an investment analyst with the Royal Bank of Canada. In 2013, he joined Bank of America Merrill Lynch as a fixed income bond trader.

Awards and decorations
White has earned the following awards and decorations:

White has earned two Overseas Service Bars and one service stripe.

See also
 List of post-Vietnam Medal of Honor recipients

References

1987 births
United States Army personnel of the War in Afghanistan (2001–2021)
Living people
Military personnel from Seattle
United States Army Medal of Honor recipients
United States Army soldiers
War in Afghanistan (2001–2021) recipients of the Medal of Honor
People from Bonney Lake, Washington